Kroa i Bø is a concert venue and a student house run mainly by volunteers made up of students of Telemark University College (TUC) (Norwegian: Høgskolen i Telemark - HiT) in Bø, Norway.

History
Established in 1971 under the name Kro & Velferd as a student welfare association with the purpose to give the local students something fun to do in their spare time. The association changed name to Kro & Kultur and focused on parties and concerts with both Norwegian and international artists in different temporary locations around Bø. The name Kroa i Bø were loosely used about the association until 1985 when the students were given a former trailer garage and the house was named Kroa i Bø. The association who's running the house is still called "Kro & Kultur", but as a whole the name "Kroa i Bø" is almost always used.

Kroa i Bø is regarded as one of the best concert venues in Norway and are often named as one of the top 5. This was officially confirmed when the venue won the prize for "Concert Promoter of the Year 2005" (Norwegian: Årets Konsertarrangør 2005), a prize given by the organization for local promoters in Norway, Norsk Rockforbund. All the big artists in Norway has played at the venue and it is common knowledge that many artists prefer to start their tours at Kroa i Bø. Mainly because it's pretty close to Oslo, the promoters are professional and the audience is welcoming.

It is the official student house for the college students in Bø and has activities like a student paper, student radio, film club and many others.
It has only one steady employee, which is the daily administrator, but some 100-150 volunteers. Only open in the school semesters between August and December, and January through May.

Artists
Artists who played in the school year of 2007/08 includes known acts like Ash (IRL), Kaizers Orchestra, Madcon, Kurt Nilsen, Raga Rockers, Timbuktu (S), The Grand, Dog Almighty and Hellbillies.

References

External links
 Kroa i Bø

Buildings and structures in Vestfold og Telemark